John Denver Faris (born January 18, 1951) is an American Chorbishop of the Syriac Maronite Church of Antioch, serving the Maronite Catholic Eparchy of Saint Maron of Brooklyn, headquartered in Brooklyn, New York. He is a canon lawyer of the Eastern Catholic Church, and an expert called upon for dialogue between the Catholic Church and the Eastern Christian Churches.

Early life 
Faris was born in 1951 in Uniontown, Pennsylvania, the son of John M. Faris and his wife, Goldie Bowlen. He attended Charles E. Boyle Elementary School, Benjamin Franklin Junior High School, and Uniontown Area High School. In 1968 he enrolled at Saint Vincent College in Latrobe, Pennsylvania. While studying there, he felt called to serve as a priest and transferred to Sacred Heart Seminary in Detroit, Michigan, where he was awarded a Bachelor of Arts degree in 1972. While residing at the Pontifical North American College in Rome, he attended the Pontifical Gregorian University, where he received a Bachelor of Sacred Theology (magna cum laude) in 1975.  He then pursued studies in moral theology at the Alphonsianum.

Archbishop Francis Mansour Zayek ordained him to the priesthood on 17 July 1976 at St. George Church in Uniontown.

Faris then returned to Rome and In 1980 he was awarded a Doctor of Eastern Canon Law (magna cum laude) from the Pontifical Oriental Institute, with a dissertation on The Communion of Catholic Churches:  Ecclesiology and Terminology.

Ministry 
After completing his doctorate, Faris was named the Vice Rector of the Cathedral of Our Lady of Lebanon in Brooklyn. Upon completing a year of service there, he was appointed Vice Chancellor of the eparchy. In 1980, he was appointed Chancellor, and later Protosyncellus (Vicar General), of the eparchy, serving in these offices until 1996. During this period, he was named a Chaplain of His Holiness in 1988 by Pope John Paul II and later ordained a chorbishop of the Maronite Church by Zayek in 1991.

From 1996 to 2009, Faris served in a variety of positions at the Catholic Near East Welfare Association (CNEWA), finally serving as Deputy Secretary General.  While serving with this special papal agency dedicated to assisting the Eastern Churches, Faris traveled extensively in the Middle East, India, northeastern Africa and Eastern Europe and was involved in the fund-raising initiatives of the agency.

In June 2009, Faris was appointed pastor of St. Louis Gonzaga Maronite Church in Utica, New York. He also serves as a judge on the Tribunal of the eparchy.

In June 2018, Faris was appointed pastor of Saint Anthony Church in Glen Allen, Virginia, effective 1 September 2018. He was additionally appointed Editor of The Maronite Voice and all electronic media and director of the Office of Communications of the Eparchy of Saint Maron.

Canon Law 

Faris serves as an assistant professor in the School of Canon Law at the Catholic University of America in Washington, D.C. Since 2020, he has lectured in the Pontifical Oriental Institute in Rome and the Institute of Oriental Canon Law of the Dharmaram Vidya Kshetram in Bangalore, India.

A member since 1984, he was elected President of the Canon Law Society of America in 1994, and later served as the chairman of the ad hoc committee responsible for the preparation of the most recent English translation of the Code of Canons of the Eastern Churches. He has also been elected the Secretary General of the Society for the Law of the Eastern Churches (1991-2000). He served as a consultor for the United States Conference of Catholic Bishops as a part of its Liaison Committee for Latin and Eastern Church Affairs (1992–96).  In January 2018, Faris was appointed Chair of the CLSA Eastern Churches Committee for a three-year term.

In September 2022, Faris was elected Vice-President of the Society for the Law of the Eastern Churches.

Faris is also a member of the Canon Law Society of Great Britain and Ireland, the Canon Law Society of Australia and New Zealand, the Canon Law Society of India, the Eastern Canon Law Society of India. He serves on the editorial boards of various journals in his field: Eastern Canon Law, Eastern Legal Thought and Gratianus.

Ecumenical Dialogues 
Faris serves as a Catholic Representative on the North American Orthodox-Catholic Theological Consultation and the United States Oriental Orthodox-Roman Catholic Consultation. From 2007 - 2011, he served as a member of the Catholic Delegation on the Joint Working Group, a liaison body of the Catholic Church and the World Council of Churches. In 2019, Faris was appointed by the Council for Promoting the Unity of Christians to the Catholic Delegation of the International Joint Commission for Theological Dialogue between the Catholic Church and the Oriental Orthodox Churches.

Equestrian Order of the Holy Sepulchre of Jerusalem 
Faris was named a Titular Canon of the Equestrian Order of the Holy Sepulchre, with the rank of Knight Commander with Star (conferred on 23 November 2013). In September 2010, he received the Order's highest honor, the Golden Palm of Jerusalem, for his dedication to and work for the Christians of the Holy Land. He is a member of the Board of Councillors of the Eastern Lieutenancy of the Order for the United States. He is involved in recruiting new members and provides extensive lectures on the Order and the Holy Land. He has recently been serving as spiritual director for seminarians on Holy Land pilgrimages sponsored by the Eastern Lieutenancy.  Despite his numerous visits and pilgrimages to the Holy Land, Faris only received the "Pilgrim's Shell" from His Beatitude Pierbattista Pizzaballa in March 2017.  On the same pilgrimage he received the Franciscan Cross in recognition of his charity towards the poor in the Holy Land.

Honors 
In 2011, Faris was presented by the Canon Law Society of America with their Role of Law Award for his outstanding contributions to canonical science.

Faris was appointed Chaplain iure sanguinis of the Sacred Military Constantinian Order of Saint George.

Presentations and writings 

Presentations

24 March 2011, New York - Anti-Defamation League "Catholic--But Not Roman: Governance Structures of Eastern Catholic Churches"
28 October 2015, Gatineau, Quebec - Canadian Canon Law Society - A Code for One and Future Easter Churches: The Code of Canons of the Eastern Churches at Twenty Five"
27 January 2016, Phoenix, Arizona - Diocese of Phoenix Hic sunt dracones Critical Pastoral Issues in the Code of Canons of the Eastern Churches
6-9 September 2016, Bangalore, India - Institute of Oriental Canon Law, Dharmaram Vidya Kshetram.  "Canon Law and Ecumenism: What We Have to Be is What We Are."
12 October 2016, Houston, TX - Canon Law Society of America.  "Synods, Councils and Assemblies: Hierarchical Structures as Expressions of Synodality"
21 October 2016 - North American Orthodox - Catholic Consultation.  "Marriage Discipline in the Catholic Communion of Churches"
23 February 2017 - Pontifical Oriental Institute Centenary Anniversary Symposium.  Il CCEO Strumento per il future delle Chiese orientali   "The Exercise of Roman Primacy and the Communion of Churches."  To be published in the proceedings of the symposium.
8 May 2017 - Eastern Regional Conference of Canonists, Meadowlands, NJ  "Eastern Catholics in the Diaspora."
1 June 2017 - Orthodox-Catholic Bishops Dialogue, Plymouth, MI.  "Marriage and Remarriage in the Catholic Church."
27 June 2021 - Oriental Orthodox-Roman Catholic Consultation on 27 September 2021 via Zoom.  "Proposal for Eucharistic Hospitality". Publishd online at Academia

Books

(Chair of CLSA Committee) Code of Canons of the Eastern Churches.  Latin-English Edition—New English Translation.  Washington, DC: Canon Law Society of America, 1995.
Eastern Catholic Churches: Constitution and Governance. Brooklyn, NY: Saint Maron Publications, 1992.
The Communion of Catholic Churches: Terminology and Ecclesiology . Brooklyn, NY: Pontifical Oriental Institute, 1985.
In collaboration with Pospishil, V. J. The New Latin Code of Canon Law and Eastern Catholics. Brooklyn, NY: Diocese of Saint Maron, 1984.
 Canon Law and Ecumenism: To Become What We Are.  Dharmaram Canonical Studies.  Bengalaru: Dharmaram Vidya Kshetram, 2018.
 Co-edited with Jobe Abbass, A Practical Commentary to the Code of Canons of the Eastern Churches.  Montreal: Wilson & LeFleur, 2019.

Articles

"Canonical Issues in the Pastoral Care of Eastern Catholics." Proceedings of the 53rd Annual Convention of the Canon Law Society of America, 154–64. Washington, DC: Canon Law Society of America, 1991.
“A Church Comes of Age: The Syro-Malankara Major Archiepiscopal Church.”  Published in Commemoration Book of Syro-Malankara Catholic Conference August, 2006.
"Code of Canons of the Eastern Churches and Temporal Goods, The." Church Finance Handbook, Editors Kevin E. McKenna, Lawrence A. Di Nardo, and Joseph W. Pokusa, 27–43. Washington, DC: Canon Law Society of America, 1999.
"The Codification and Revision of Eastern Canon Law." Studia Canonica 17 (1983): 449–85.
"Eastern Churches in the Western World: Roots, Growth, Future." Catholic Near East 26, no. 6 (2000): 20–25.
“Emerging From the Catacombs." Catholic Near East 24, no. 1 (1998).
"Inter-Ritual Matters in the Revised Code of Canon Law." Studia Canonica 15 (1983): 239–59.
"Interritual Matters in the Revised Code of Canon Law."50th International Congress of Canon Law, 821-23.  Proceedings of the 50th International Congress of Canon Law: 1986.
"One and Many Churches." Catholic Near East 24, no. 3 (1998): 16–21.
"An Overview of the Code of Canons of the Eastern Churches." New Commentary on the Code of Canon Law, Editors John P. Beal, James A. Coriden, and Green Thomas J., 27–44. New York: Paulist Press, 2000.
"A Pearl Anniversary." Catholic Near East  20, no. 6 (1994): 20–25.
"Penal Law in the Catholic Church: A Comparative Overview." Folia Canonica 2 (1999): 53–93.
"The Reception of Baptized Non-Catholics into Full Communion." Acta Symposii Internationalis Circa Codicem Canonum Ecclesiarum Orientalium Kaslik, 24-29 Aprilis 1995., 159–77. Kaslik, Lebanon: Université Saint-Espirit, 1996.
“A Road Map for the Maronite Church.” The Maronite Voice
"Synodal Governance in the Eastern Catholic Churches." Proceedings of the 49th Annual Convention of the Canon Law Society of America., 212–26. Washington DC: Canon Law Society of America, 1987.
“Territory and the Eastern Catholic Experience in the United States.”  Folia Canonica 5 (2002) 51–58.
"Toward a Recognition of the Status of the Eastern Churches in the Catholic Communion of Churches." The Living Light  32  (1996): 50–57.
“The Latin Church Sui Iuris.” The Jurist 62 (2002) 280–293.
"Upon This Rock." Catholic Near East 25/6 (1999): 6-11.
“The Synod of Bishops and Council of Hierarchs in the Code of Canons of the Eastern Churches” Studies in Church Law
“Byzantines in Italy: A Microcosm of an Evolving Ecclesiology.”  The Jurist 67 (2007) 89-108.
"At Home Everywhere--A Reconsideration of the Territorium Proprium of the Patriarchal Churches."  The Jurist 69 (2009) 5-30.
“Ascription in a Church sui iuris.”  Diccionario General de Derecho Canónico.  University of Navarra.
“Latin Church” Diccionario General de Derecho Canónico.  University of Navarra.
"Eastern Churches in a Western World: Relationship to the Churches of Origin." Journal of St. Thomas Christians 21:2 (2010) 3-20.
 "Synodal Governance in the Eastern Catholic Churches." Iustitia 2/2 (December 2011) 313–337.
 "A Code for the 'Other Lung'" Recht. Religion en Semanleving (2012) 91-115.
"The Particular Law of the Maronite Church with a Special Focus on Territorial Restrictions." Kanon 23 (2014) 88-108.
"Structures for Liturgical Reform and the Code of Canons of the Eastern Churches." Questions Liturgiques  95 (2014) 128–147.
"God and Church: Communions of One and Many."  Iustitia 5:1 (June 2014) 9-22.
 "Law for Once and Future Churches: The Code of Canons of the Eastern Churches in 2015."  Under publication.
 "Exercise of Roman Primacy and the Communion of Churches." In Il CCEO--Strumento per il future delle Chiese orientali cattolici.  Atti del Simposio di Roma, 22-24 2017 Centenario del Pontifico Istituo Orientali (1917-2017), edited by G. Ruyssen and S. Kokkaravalayil. Kanonika 25 Rome:Pontificio Istituto Orientali, 2017) 413–454.
"Ascription in the Eastern and Latin Churches in Light of De Concordia inter Codices.  Presentation given at the Canon Law Society of Australia and New Zealand, Auckland, New Zealand 5 September 2017 in Canon Law Society of Australia and New Zealand, Proceedings Fifty-First Annual Conference 2017, 15-34.
 "Marriage in the Eastern and Latin Churches in Light of De Concordia inter Codices."  Presentation given at the Canon Law Society of Australia and New Zealand, Auckland, New Zealand 6 September 2017 in Proceedings Fifty-First Annual Conference 2017, 68–86.
 “Synods, Councils and Assemblies: Hierarchical Structures as Expressions of Synodality," Canon Law Society of America, Proceedings of the Seventy-Eighth Annual Convention.  October 10–13, 2016. 187–217.
 "God and Church: Communions of One and Many" in Communio: The Eastern Catholic Churches, 75-92.  Fairfax, VA: Eastern Catholic Associates, 2018/
 "Ascription Status and Crucial Moments: When Does Ascription Status Matter? Canon Law Society of America, Proceedings of the Eighty-Third Annual Convention (2021) 105-124.
 "The Role of Ecumenism in a Synodal Church," Iustitia 12 (December 2021) 247-268.
 "Ecumenism and the Challenge to Ecclesial Structures." Fifty Years of Encounter among the Eastern Churches Kanon XXVI (Nyíregaza, St. Athanasius Greek-Catholic theological Institute, 2022), 377-394. 
 "The Role of Consultation in Eparchia Governance." Studia Canonica

Book reviews

“The Code of Canons of the Eastern Churches. Edited by Jose Chiramel and Kuriakose Bharanikulangara.”  India: St. Thomas Academy for Research, 1992." Published in The Jurist 53:1 (1993): 216-19.
"The Spirit of the Eastern Code. by George Nedungatt.”  Rome:  Centre for Indian and Inter-Religious Studies, 1993.  Published in The Jurist 55 (1995): 407-9.
“Two Codes in Comparison by Jobe Abbass With Foreword by Ivan Žužek.”  Rome: Pontifical Oriental Institute, 1997.  Published in Orientalia Christiana Periodica 65, no. 2 (1999): 473-77.
“Laity and Church Temporalities—Appraisal of a Tradition by George Nedungatt, S.J.” (Bangalore, India: Dharmaram Publications, 2000).  Published in Studia Canonica 35/2 (2001) 535-537.
“Commento al Codice dei Canoni delle Chiese Orientali by Pio Vito Pinto. (Città del Vaticano: Librerria Editrice Vaticana, 2001).  Published in Studia Canonica  36/1 (2002) 259-260.
“Vested in Grace: Priesthood and Marriage in the Christian East by Joseph J. Allen (ed.)” (Brookline, MA: Holy Cross Orthodox Press, 2001).  Published in The Jurist 63/1 (2003) 200-202.
“Comparative Sacramental Discipline in the CCEO and CIC, A Handbook for the Pastoral Care of Other Catholic Churches Sui Iuris by Francis J. Marini (ed.).” (Washington, DC: Canon Law Society of America, 2003).  Published in Studia Canonica 38/1 (2004) 266-269.
"Dall’Oronte al Tevere.  Scritti in onore del cardinale Ignace Moussa I Daoud per il cinquantesimo di sacerdozio, by Gianpaolo Rigotti (ed.)."  (Rome:  Edizioni “Orientalia Christiana,” 2004).”  Published in The Catholic Historical Review (April 2007) 440-442.
“Le Chiese sui iuris. Criteri di Individuazione e Delimitatione by Luis Okulik (ed.).” (Venice:Studium Generale Marcianum, 2005).  Published in The Jurist  68 (2008) 2: 595-597.
“Salvific Law: Salvific Character of CCEO, An Historical Overview by Thomas Kuzhinapurath.” (Trivandrum, India:MS Publications, 2008).  Published in Studia Canonica  42(2009) 1: 269–270.
"The Guidelines for the Revision of the Eastern Code: Their Impact on CCEO by Sunny Kokkaravaalayil." (Rome: Pontificio Istituo Orientale, 2009).  Published in Studia Canonica

References

Sources 
Biographical Note in Eastern Catholic Churches: Constitution and Governance

1951 births
People from Uniontown, Pennsylvania
American Maronites
Saint Vincent College alumni
Pontifical Gregorian University alumni
Pontifical Oriental Institute alumni
20th-century Eastern Catholic bishops
21st-century Eastern Catholic bishops
Catholic University of America School of Canon Law faculty
Canonical theologians
Eastern Catholic canon law jurists
Living people
20th-century jurists
21st-century jurists
Members of the Order of the Holy Sepulchre
Eastern Catholic priests